The Rivière des Prairies, called the Back River in English, is a delta channel of the Ottawa River in southwestern Quebec, Canada. The Kanien'kehá:ka called it Skowanoti, meaning "River behind the island". The river separates the cities of Laval and Montreal.

Geography
Flowing west to east, the Rivière des Prairies bisects the Hochelaga Archipelago and originates in the Lake of Two Mountains. It flows on either side of Île Bizard (part of Montreal), then divides the Island of Montreal (Montreal) to the south from Île Jésus (Laval) to the north, after which it flows into the St. Lawrence River at the eastern tip of the Island of Montreal.

The river contains a large number of islands, including Île Bizard, the Îles Laval (Île Bigras, Île Pariseau, Île Verte and Île Ronde) belonging to Laval, and Île de la Visitation, a nature park belonging to Montreal. There are also islands named Île Mercier, Île Ménard, Île Jasmin, Île Barwick, Île de Roxboro, Île aux Chats, Île Paton, Île Perry, Île Lapierre, Île Boutin, Île Rochon and Île Gagné.

The Rivière des Prairies has many rapids. Rapids are shown in several places on the 1879 map of Henry Whitmersome Hopkins, and on Gordon and Gotch's map of the Island of Montreal from 1924. Named rapids of the river, starting from the west, are the "Rapides de Cap-Saint-Jacques", the 
Lalemant(Dutchman) Rapids that are located between Île Bizard and Laval (with a ferry), the "Rapides du Cheval Blanc"(Whitehorse rapids) that are located in between the borough of Pierrefonds-Roxboro and Sainte-Dorothée, the Laval rapids, the "Sault-au-Récollet Rapids" that are located north of Bordeaux Prison, and ending with the "Rapides de la Rivière des Prairies".

The riverfront in the West Island area was famous for its beaches along the river. Some were named "Crystal", "Noel/Roy", "Riviera", and Roxboro municipal beach

Environmental issues
The river receives massive discharges of untreated liquid waste from metropolitan Montreal and the newly developed suburbs by way of over 150 discharge outlets. Whenever there is significant rainfall on the island of Montreal, household sewage is mixed with the city street rainwater and discharged untreated into the river. This sewage turns the river into essentially an open sewer. The sewage problem was reported in the year 1911., and a need to purify Montreal sewage in 1935.
 The Montreal Board of Trade (BOT) commissioned a report on the water pollution in the late 1950s, and the report was given to Premier Barrette.

Montreal has six drinking-water plants on the Island whose source of water is the Rivière des Prairies and Lac Saint Louis. Reportedly, Montreal and Quebec city drinking water is tested.

It is claimed modern sewage treatment techniques have reversed much of the damage from the sewage.
Some people consider the river clean again, starting in the year 1998, when most of the sewage was treated before being discharged. However, parts of the river are never suitable for swimming . Specifically the location of R.D.P. 140, the Rive-Boisée area has been polluted since the year 1971 is still polluted from raw sewage more than forty years later . The Rive-Boisée problem had been noticed and was reported to be repaired in 2014. The reason for the sewage problem is that the storm sewer drain system and the sanitary sewer system were mistakenly connected in many places, and it takes money to correct and repair. Reports from the R.S.M.A.(Réseau de suivi du milieu aquatique) dated 2021 on the water quality of RDP-140 indicate the problem has not been fixed.

From Bing maps, many of the sewage output locations can be seen on the river shoreline. The solution to the visible pollution (plastic bags, toilet paper, condoms) that accumulates on the shoreline is to use a type of a screen at all the storm drains and outlets that expel the rainwater-garbage mixture into the river.

See also
 Fecal-oral route Diseases that can be transmitted from feces in water.
 Hochelaga Archipelago
 List of bridges spanning the Rivière des Prairies
 List of crossings of the Rivière des Prairies
 List of hydroelectric stations
 List of Quebec rivers
 Saint Lawrence Seaway

References

External links
 RSMA. Le Réseau de suivi du milieu aquatique. The river water tested weekly.

Further reading

 Agence de développement de réseaux locaux de services de santé et de services sociaux de Montréal (Québec). Health Care, in Your Neighbourhood. Health and Social Service Resources in the CLSC Rivière-des-Prairies District. Montreal: Agence de développement de réseaux locaux de services de santé et de services sociaux, Montreal, 2004.
 Canada. Bill An Act to Remove Certain Obstructions to the Navigation of the Rivière des Prairies, and to Repeal Certain Clauses of the Acts 10th and 11th Victoria, Cap. 97 and 98. Quebec: Thompson, 2003.  (1860 Bibliographic record)
 Sylvie Paré. Impacts of Ethnic Changes on the Housing Market in the Rivière-des-Prairies District of Montreal. [Ottawa]: CMHC, 2006.
 Rybczynski, Witold, Avi Friedman, and Brenda Baxter. Urban Design for Affordability = Urbanisme Et Conception De Maisons Abordables, Rivière-des-Prairies. Montreal: Affordable Homes Program, School of Architecture, McGill University, 1991.
 Verdon, R., and M. Gendron. 1991. "Creation of Artificial Spawning Grounds Downstream of the Rivière-des-Prairies Spillway". Transactions — Canadian Electrical Association. Engineering and Operation Division. 30.

 
Landforms of Laval, Quebec
Landforms of Montreal
Tributaries of the Saint Lawrence River